The 1985–86 Gamma Ethniki was the third season since the official establishment of the third tier of Greek football in 1983. Charavgiakos and Xanthi were crowned champions in Southern and Northern Group respectively, thus winning promotion to Beta Ethniki. Korinthos and Olympiacos Volos also won promotion as a runners-up of the groups.

Neapolis, Agrinio, Ilioupolis, Poseidon Nea Michaniona, Odysseas Kordelio, Iraklis Kavala and Almopos Aridea were relegated to Delta Ethniki.

Southern Group

League table

Northern Group

League table

Relegation play-off

|}

References

Third level Greek football league seasons
3
Greece